Luiyi Lugo (born 21 February 1994) is a Dominican international footballer who plays for SC Cham in Switzerland, as a forward or winger. He also holds Swiss citizenship.

Career
Lugo has played for the youth system of FC Aarau.

He made his international debut for Dominican Republic on 25 March 2015. He was a starter in a 0–3 friendly lost against Cuba, being substituted at the 73rd minute.

References

External links

 Luiyi Lugo at FC Wettswil-Bonstetten

1994 births
People from Santiago de los Caballeros
Living people
Dominican Republic footballers
Dominican Republic international footballers
Association football forwards
Association football midfielders
FC Baden players
FC Wohlen players
SC Young Fellows Juventus players
SC Cham players
2. Liga Interregional players
Swiss 1. Liga (football) players
Swiss Challenge League players
Swiss Promotion League players
Dominican Republic expatriate footballers
Dominican Republic expatriate sportspeople in Switzerland
Expatriate footballers in Switzerland